James Theodore Starks (April 23, 1906 – death unknown), nicknamed "Bruiser", was an American Negro league first baseman from 1927 to 1946. 

A native of Springfield, Missouri, James Theodore Starks made his Negro leagues debut in 1927 with the Memphis Red Sox.  Starks was later transferred to the Kansas City Monarchs. He went on to play for several additional teams, including eight seasons with the New York Black Yankees, where he finished his career in 1946.

References

External links
 and Seamheads
 Jim Starks at Negro League Baseball Players Association

1906 births
 Place of death missing
 Year of death missing
 Birmingham Black Barons players
 Harrisburg Stars players
 Kansas City Monarchs players
 Memphis Red Sox players
 New York Black Yankees players
 New York Cubans players
 Newark Dodgers players
 Pittsburgh Crawfords players
Baseball infielders